Anthony José Brea Salazar (born February 3, 1983) is a Venezuelan professional racing cyclist.

Major results

2006
 1st Stage 13 Vuelta a Venezuela
 1st Points classification Clásico Ciclístico Banfoandes
2007
 1st Stages 2, 9 & 13 Vuelta a Cuba
 1st Stage 10 Vuelta Ciclista Lider al Sur
 1st Stage 3 Volta do Rio de Janeiro
 2nd Road race, National Road Championships
2008
 1st Stage 2 Vuelta al Táchira
 3rd Clasico Ciudad de Caracas

External links

1983 births
Living people
Sportspeople from Valencia, Venezuela
Venezuelan male cyclists